Peter Clingerman Fishburn (September 2, 1936 – June 10, 2021) was an American mathematician, known as a pioneer in the field of decision theory. In collaboration with Steven Brams, Fishburn published a paper about approval voting in 1978.

Biography

Intellectual
Fishburn received his B.S. in industrial engineering from Pennsylvania State University in 1958, his M.S. in operations research in 1961, and a Ph.D. in operations research in 1962, the latter two from the Case Institute of Technology.

In collaboration with Steven Brams, Fishburn published a paper about approval voting in 1978. In 1996, he won the John von Neumann Theory Prize. He also won the Decision Analysis Publication Award in 1991 and the Frank P. Ramsey Medal in 1987.

He was elected to the 2002 class of Fellows of the Institute for Operations Research and the Management Sciences.

Personal
Fishburn retired after many years of research at AT&T Bell Laboratories in the state of New Jersey, United States. He was married to the theologian Janet Forsythe Fishburn. He died on June 10, 2021, in Racine, Wisconsin.

See also
 Fishburn set
 Fishburn–Shepp inequality
 Maximal lotteries

References
 Brams, Steven J., and Fishburn, Peter C. (1983), Approval Voting.  Boston: Birkhäuser.  Second edition (2007).  New York: Springer.
 Fishburn, P.C. (1964), Decision and Value Theory.  Publications in Operations Research, No. 10.  New York: John Wiley and Sons.
 Fishburn, P.C. (1970), Utility Theory for Decision Making.  Publications in Operations Research, No. 18.  New York: John Wiley and Sons.
 Fishburn, Peter C. (1972), Mathematics of Decision Theory.  Methods and Models in the Social Sciences, 3.  The Hague: Mouton.
 Fishburn, Peter C. (1973), The Theory of Social Choice.  Princeton, N. J.: Princeton University Press.
 Fishburn, Peter C. (1982), The Foundations of Expected Utility.  Theory and Decision Library, Vol. 31.  Dordrecht: D. Reidel.
 
 Fishburn, Peter C. (1988), Nonlinear Preference and Utility Theory.  Baltimore, Md.: Johns Hopkins University Press.

Notes

External links

 
 Biography of Peter Fishburn from the Institute for Operations Research and the Management Sciences
 

1936 births
20th-century American mathematicians
21st-century American mathematicians
John von Neumann Theory Prize winners
2021 deaths
American operations researchers
Voting theorists
Fellows of the Econometric Society
Fellows of the Institute for Operations Research and the Management Sciences